Hintze is a surname. Notable people with the surname include:

Carl Hintze (1851–1916), German mineralogist and crystallographer
Christian Ide Hintze (1953–2012), Austrian poet and performance artist
Johannes Hintze (born 1999), German swimmer
Michael Hintze (born 1953), British-Australian businessman, philanthropist and Conservative Party patron, based in the United Kingdom
Otto Hintze (1861–1940), German historian of public administration
Peter Hintze (1950–2016), German politician of the Christian Democratic Union (CDU) and from 2013 one of the six Vice Presidents of the Bundestag
Paul von Hintze (1864–1941), German naval officer, diplomat and politician

See also
Hintze Ribeiro disaster
Christian Hintze Holm (born 1964), Norwegian politician for the Socialist Left Party
Ernesto Hintze Ribeiro (1849–1907),  Portuguese politician, statesman

References